Dato' Sri Mohd Zin bin Mohamed (Jawi: محمد زين بن محمد; born 28 March 1953) was the Member of the Parliament of Malaysia for the Sepang constituency in Selangor from 2004 to 2013. A member of the United Malays National Organisation (UMNO) in Malaysia's ruling Barisan Nasional coalition, he was Malaysia's Minister for Works from March to April 2008.

Early life
Mohd Zin was born in Muar, Johore and obtained his Diploma of Civil Engineering from UiTM in 1977. He then went on to work with PKNS before continuing his studies in Bradley University, Peoria, Illinois, USA. In 1980, he furthered his study in the same university to obtain his master's degree.

Political career
Mohd Zin firstly became the branch chairperson of the Section 8 Shah Alam UMNO branch (1986–1994), the youth wing chief of UMNO Shah Alam division (1988–1994) and later became the treasurer for Selangor UMNO Youth as well as simultaneously serving as member of the national UMNO Youth wing executive council.

In 2001, he was elected as the Deputy Divisional Chief of UMNO Shah Alam and later became the protem divisional chairman of both UMNO Kota Raja and later UMNO Sepang divisions.

He entered the federal parliament in the 2004 election, winning the seat of Sepang. During his first term in parliament, he was appointed as Deputy Minister for Works. After his re-election in 2008, he became the Minister for Works, replacing the long-serving Samy Vellu. However, in April 2009, Mohd Zin was dropped from the Cabinet by incoming Prime Minister Najib Tun Razak, and was replaced in his ministry by Shaziman Abu Mansor. In November 2009, he was appointed as the Chairman of Keretapi Tanah Melayu, peninsular Malaysia's main rail operator.

In the 2013 election, the Barisan Nasional coalition suffered heavy losses in the state of Selangor, and Mohd Zin lost his parliamentary seat to Mohamed Hanipa Maidin of the Pan-Malaysian Islamic Party (PAS).

Election results

Honours
 :
 Knight Commander of the Order of the Crown of Selangor (DPMS) – Dato' (2001)
 :
 Grand Knight of the Order of Sultan Ahmad Shah of Pahang (SSAP) – Dato' Sri (2008)

References

 

Living people
1953 births
People from Johor
People from Muar
Malaysian people of Malay descent
Malaysian Muslims
Malaysian engineers
United Malays National Organisation politicians
Members of the Dewan Rakyat
Members of the Selangor State Legislative Assembly
Government ministers of Malaysia
Bradley University alumni
21st-century Malaysian politicians
Knights Commander of the Order of the Crown of Selangor